Rosenheim Technical University of Applied Sciences or TH Rosenheim (from German Technische Hochschule Rosenheim) is a university in Rosenheim, Germany with its main campus in Rosenheim and campuses in Mühldorf am Inn, Burghausen and Chiemgau. The TH Rosenheim is an hour's drive away from the Bavarian capital Munich and the Austrian city of Salzburg. The university's key areas of expertise are business, technology, design, healthcare and social studies. Established in 1971 the university is best known for its Faculty of Wood Engineering and Construction.

Overview 
Rosenheim Technical University of Applied Sciences currently offers more than 40 Bachelor's and master's degree courses at four branches. Around 6000 students were enrolled in the 2018/19 winter semester, and more than thousand students successfully completed their studies at the TH Rosenheim in the 2018 examination year.

History 
In 1925, regional entrepreneurs, including Rosenheim sawmill owner Hugo Laue (1869–1956), founded the private Holztechnikum. The Holztechnikum was first housed at the Max-Josephs-Square in the city centre of Rosenheim. At the beginning, in May 1925, the school had 22 students, the evening courses for masters and assistants were attended by twelve people. In 1943 this private technical school was nationalized.

In the 1950s the expansion of the Holztechnikum began, a wood economics course and a sawmill technology course were introduced. In addition, the technical school was renamed "Staatliches Holztechnikum Rosenheim - Staatliche Ingenieurschule".

From 1953, a six-semester engineering course in the field of wood was offered.

And in 1958, practice and test facilities were built at the site of today's university.

The latter moved to its present location on Marienbergerstraße in 1970 and was upgraded to Rosenheim University of Applied Sciences in 1971 when the Bavarian Law on Universities of Applied Sciences (Fachhochschulgesetz), came into force. The Rosenheim University of Applied Sciences started with the departments of General Sciences, Business Administration, Wood Technology and Plastics Technology.

Since 2014, the university has had an additional branch to the Rosenheim one with the Campus Mühldorf am Inn. In 2016, the university further expanded to the Campus Burghausen.

At the start of the 2018/2019 winter semester, the last change of the name to Rosenheim Technical University of Applied Sciences took place. The university still has the status of a university of applied sciences.

The Chiemgau Campus in Traunstein opened for the 2019/20 winter semester and is the latest addition to the campus.

University presidents 

 1965 - 1972: Josef Gefahrt
 1972 - 1986: Josef Meister
 1986 - 2002: Hans Zang
 2002 - 2009: Alfred Leidig
 since 2009: Heinrich Köster

Facultys, Institutes and Degree Programmes

Faculty of Applied Health and Social Sciences 
 Bachelor's Degree Programme in Healthcare Management
 Bachelor's Degree Programme in Physiotherapy
 Bachelor's Degree Programme in Nursing

Faculty of Applied Natural Sciences and Humanities 
 Bachelor's Degree Programme in Energy and Building Technology
 Bachelor's Degree Programme in Business Mathematics – Actuarial Sciences 
 Master's Degree Programme in Building Physics (in cooperation with HFT Stuttgart)

Faculty of Business Administration 
 Bachelor's Degree Programme in Business Administration 
 Master's Degree Programme in Management and Internationalisation of Small and Medium-Sized Companies

Faculty of Wood Technology and Construction 
 Bachelor's Degree Programme in Wood Building and Construction
 Bachelor's Degree Programme in Wood Technology
 Bachelor's Degree Programme in Interior Engineering
 Bachelor's Degree Programme in Civil Engineering
Bachelor's Degree Programme in Engineering Pedagogy, specialisation in construction technology
 Master's Degree Programme in Wood Technology

Faculty of Computer Science 
 Bachelor's Degree Programme in Business Information Systems
 Bachelor's Degree Programme in Computer Science
Bachelor's Degree Programme in Applied Artificial Intelligence
 Master's Degree Programme in Computer Science

Faculty of Interior Architecture, Architecture and Design 
 Bachelor's Degree Programme in Architecture
 Bachelor's Degree Programme in Interior Architecture
 Master's Degree Programme in Interior Architecture and Furniture Design

Faculty of Engineering 
 Bachelor's Degree Programme in Plastics Engineering
 Bachelor's Degree Programme in Mechatronics
 Bachelor's Degree Programme in Mechanical Engineering
 Bachelor's Degree Programme in Electrical Engineering and Information Technology
Bachelor's Degree Programme in Medical Technology
 Master's Degree Programme in Engineering Sciences
 Master's Degree Programme in Applied Research & Development

Faculty of Management and Engineering 
 Bachelor's Degree Programme in Management and Engineering 
 Master's Degree Programme in Management and Engineering

Institut Burghausen 
 Bachelor's Degree Programme in Business Administration
 Bachelor's Degree Programme in Chemical Engineering
 Bachelor's Degree Programme in Chemtronics
Bachelor's Degree Programme in Environmental Technology

Institut Mühldorf 
 Bachelor's Degree Programme in Applied Psychology
 Bachelor's Degree Programme in Education of Children and Young People
 Bachelor's Degree Programme in Social Work

Academy for Professionals 
 Bachelor's Degree Programme in Business Administration
 Bachelor's Degree Programme in Mechanical Engineering
Bachelor's Degree Programme in Corporate Management for Health Professionals
 Master's Degree Programme in Circular Economy
Master's Degree Programme in Windows and Facades 
 Master's Degree Programme in Wood Construction and Energy Efficiency
 Master's Degree Programme in Management and Leadership
 Master's Degree Programme in Management and Engineering

Notable alumni and professors

Professors 
Hochschullehrer (Rosenheim)

Alumni 
Marc-André Houmard (1928–2014), Swiss politician (FDP)
Ralf Speth (* 1955), senior industry executive
Bärbel Kofler (* 1967), politician (SPD)
Gerda Stauner (* 1973), author

Facilities

RO-BERTA 
The RO-BERTA project (Rosenheims meteorologische Besonderheiten: Eine Regelungs- Technische Aufgabe, Rosenheim's meteorological features: A control task) was launched in 2010 with the aim of supporting anti-hail pilots in selecting the vaccination area and setting up a database for basic research on large-scale weather conditions during hailstorms.

roteg 
The construction of the Rosenheim Technology Centre Energy & Buildings (Rosenheimer Technologiezentrum Energie & Gebäude, roteg) began in July 2016. 800 square metres of state-of-the-art laboratories (ventilation and air-conditioning technology and systems, sound measurement technology, energy and material flow management, solar technology, networks and energy storage systems, sustainable heat generation systems and energy monitoring as well as transparent building envelopes and in situ measurements) are available for the benefit of all engineering and energy and building technology courses at TH Rosenheim. The technology centre also cooperates with companies and is involved in various research projects.

wiko 
The Wirtschaftskolloquium Oberbayern (Business Colloquium Upper Bavaria, wiko) sees itself as a network of regional business associations and federations. The aim is to form a common voice on economic topics in Southeast Upper Bavaria in order to create promising framework conditions for sustainable economic activities and entrepreneurships, to promote economic rationality and to strengthen communication between its members.

Wiko's patron is Dr. Marcel Huber, member of the Landtag of Bavaria. Once a year wiko invites to a highlight event. So far, Manfred Bischoff (2015), Rudolf Staudigl (2016), Wolfgang Clement (2017) and Theo Waigel (2018) have lectured on current economic, political and social topics.

ezro 
Founded in 2012, Energiezukunft Rosenheim (Energy Future Rosenheim, ezro) is an association of the city and the district of Rosenheim, the Rosenheim Technical University of Applied Sciences and public, private and commercial stakeholders. The initiative is active in the fields of agriculture, municipalities, e-mobility, energy and citizens' initiatives, buildings and trade. Ezro annually awards the Energy Future Prize for innovative renovation or new construction measures in the regional private housing sector.

Library 
There are libraries in all three branches of the TH Rosenheim, the largest one is located at the Rosenheim campus. The library there is open to the public. The offer is oriented to university-relevant topics and includes: books, e-books, e-journals, print media, specialist databases and standards.

Guided tours and literature research training courses expand the library's range of services. Numerous workplaces create a concentrated learning atmosphere. Lockers are available too.

Family office 
The university has a family office. This office provides assistance in studying, studying with a child, caring for relatives and with the topic of career and family.

University Sports 
For the students and employees of TH Rosenheim there is an extensive range of sports, which is newly compiled each semester, Currently the university offers courses in over 30 different disciplines and sports. TH Rosenheim itself also participates in championships and tournaments with its own teams. For example, the men's football team took second place in the Bavarian University Cup 2019. At the Bavarian Winter University Championships 2019, the staff took first place in the Alpine Skiing category and 2nd place in the Shooting category.

Cafeteria 
In the main building of TH Rosenheim Studentenwerk München runs the so-called Stu Bistro. In summer the cozy cafeteria garden is also open. In addition to breakfast and lunch menus, there is a salad bar, fruit and snacks, sweets and drinks. At the espresso bar in the cafeteria you can get coffee and other drinks as well as snacks. There are also several snack and drink machines on the campus. Payment is cashless with the Student Card.

Rosenheim Observatory 
The observatory at the TH Rosenheim was built in the 1980s and 1990s by Prof. Aribert Nieswandt. The observatory was and is used also for the education of the students. In addition, there are regular public guided tours and lectures.

Awards 
A team from the university took second place at the Solar Decathlon Europe 2010 in Madrid. For this, the students developed an energy self-sufficient residential building.
As part of the Excellence Initiative 2012, the Rosenheim University of Applied Sciences was honoured as a partner of the Technical University of Munich for its pioneering cooperation in the fields of wood technology, timber construction and energy efficiency.
In 2014, the Technical University of Rosenheim won the European Satellite Navigation Competition (ESNC) with RO-BERTA, the largest international ideas competition in the field of satellite navigation. The university prevailed against more than 50 universities and institutions worldwide.

See also 

 Education in Germany
 List of universities in Germany
 List of forestry universities and colleges

References

External links 
Hochschule Rosenheim website (in German)
English information page

Rosenheim
Rosenheim
Universities and colleges in Bavaria